Loudetiopsis is a genus of African and South American plants in the grass family.

 Species

 formerly included
see Dilophotriche 
 Loudetiopsis occidentalis - Dilophotriche occidentalis 
 Loudetiopsis pobeguinii - Dilophotriche pobeguinii 
 Loudetiopsis purpurea  - Dilophotriche tristachyoides 
 Loudetiopsis tristachyoides - Dilophotriche tristachyoides

References

External links
 Grassbase - The World Online Grass Flora

Panicoideae
Poaceae genera
Grasses of Africa
Grasses of South America